Abdullah Nasser Murisi (born 24 August 1999), is a Qatari professional footballer who plays as a winger for Qatar Stars League side Al-Arabi.

Career statistics

Club

Notes

References

External links

1999 births
Living people
Qatari footballers
Al-Khor SC players
Al-Arabi SC (Qatar) players
Qatar Stars League players
Association football wingers
Qatar under-20 international footballers
Qatar youth international footballers